Butha-Buthe is the capital city or camptown of the Butha-Buthe District in Lesotho. It has a population of 35,108 (2016 census). It is named for Butha-Buthe Mountain to the north of the town. The city's name means "place of deposits."

Butha-Buthe was founded in 1884 in order to provide the local ruler with a place where he could pay taxes, rather than forcing him to the more distant town of Hlotse.

The town has a high school called Bokoro High School. A Canadian organization called Help Lesotho, has been assisting the school with their literary skills, and it is now becoming one of the highest ranked schools for literacy skills out of the schools, assisted by Help Lesotho. Bokoro is twinned with Ridgemont High School in Ottawa.

Sport

Butha-Buthe is home to the former Lesotho Premier League football team, Butha-Buthe Warriors, who currently play in Lesotho A-Division North Stream.

Populated places in Butha-Buthe District